Stocking is a former municipality in the district of Leibnitz in Styria, Austria. Since the 2015 Styria municipal structural reform, it was divided between the municipalities Wildon and Sankt Georgen an der Stiefing.

References

Cities and towns in Leibnitz District